Hélène LeBlanc (born March 27, 1958) is a Canadian politician. She served in the House of Commons of Canada from 2011 to 2015, representing the riding of LaSalle—Émard as a member of the New Democratic Party. In the official opposition shadow cabinet, she was critic for Industry.

Early life and career
LeBlanc was born on March 27, 1958 in Lyster, Quebec. Her father was a doctor and her mother was a school trustee and mayor of Lyster, sparking her interest in politics. LeBlanc received a Bachelor of Arts degree in 1979 from Université Sainte-Anne and a Bachelor of Education degree from the University of Ottawa in 1983.

LeBlanc worked as an educator, teaching French in Vancouver and Ottawa. She also served as an interpreter and guide for the Canada Museums of Science and Technology Corporation in Ottawa and the Canada Agriculture Museum.

LeBlanc later received a Bachelor of Science degree in agriculture and environment from McGill University in 2004. An agronomist by training, she served as a project manager for the Conseil d'assainissement et d'aménagement du ruisseau Lacorne prior to her election as MP.

LeBlanc also worked as an assistant to persons suffering from Alzheimers Baluchon Alzheimer and as an agro-environment officer with the Fédération de l’Union des producteurs agricoles de l’Outaouais-Laurentides.

LeBlanc is an avid cyclist and a member of Vélo Québec.

Member of Parliament
LeBlanc first entered politics in 2009 with Projet Montréal, seeking the position of borough councilor for the district of Saint-Paul-Émard. Although her campaign was unsuccessful, she gained the attention of the New Democratic Party (NDP) and was chosen as their nominee in the 2011 federal election to represent the riding of LaSalle—Émard. LeBlanc was elected on May 2, 2011, defeating freshman incumbent Lise Zarac of the Liberal Party with 42.2% of the vote. She assumed office on May 30, 2011.

On May 26, 2011, then-leader of the NDP Jack Layton named LeBlanc to his shadow cabinet as critic for Science and Technology. She was later promoted to critic for Industry in 2012 by Layton’s successor, Thomas Mulcair.

In these roles, LeBlanc played a role in the development of policy on science, technology, industry, and innovation for the NDP. She defended the right of government scientists to speak freely to the media and public, worked to reform Canada’s research and development programs, and advocated for green initiatives in Canadian research.

LeBlanc became an active figure in the arena of science and technology, bringing visibility to the NDP in these areas. In 2011, she attended the annual conference of the American Association for the Advancement of Science Conference as the official delegate of the NDP. Also in 2011, LeBlanc was part of a keynote panel at the Canadian Science Policy Conference. She met to discuss science policy with foreign diplomats including the Ambassador of the United States and the Ambassador of Mexico.

In the 2015 federal election, LeBlanc was defeated in the redistributed riding of LaSalle—Émard—Verdun by Liberal David Lametti.

Electoral record

References

1958 births
Living people
New Democratic Party MPs
Members of the House of Commons of Canada from Quebec
Women members of the House of Commons of Canada
University of Ottawa alumni
McGill University Faculty of Agricultural and Environmental Sciences alumni
21st-century Canadian politicians
21st-century Canadian women politicians